Tatiana De Fatima Palanca Lopes Pereira, (born October 13, 1986), known professionally as Miss Tati, is a Norwegian singer. She released 3 singles in 2015, followed by a solo album in 2017.

Biography 
Born in Portugal to Angolan parents in 1986, the soul and R&B singer grew up in the city of Setúbal before moving to Bergen in Norway. In 2015, she gained international and national recognition. Her single, “Don’t Let Go”, got attention from Okayafrica, The Guardian  playlist, and a shout out from former BBC Radio 1 host Rob da Bank. In 2019, she performed at festivals like Nattjazz, Bergenfest, Øyafestivalen and Oslo World Music Festival in Oslo.

Discography

Singles 

2015: Don't Let Go Single
2015: Shakedown Single
2015: Be Free Single

Solo album 
 2017: Finally Miss Tati

References

External links 

Angolan-Born Singer Miss Tati’s Smooth ‘Shakedown’ on OkayAfrica.com

Musicians from Bergen
1986 births
Living people
21st-century Norwegian singers
21st-century Norwegian women singers